Khirbet Khizeh (Hebrew: חִרְבֶּת חִזְעָה, also Hirbet Hizeh, Hirbet Hizah) is a historical fiction novel by Israeli writer S. Yizhar which was published in 1949, and deals with the expulsion of the fictional village of Khirbet Hiz'ah, practically representing a depiction of all Arab villages whose inhabitants were expelled during the 1948 Arab–Israeli War in 1948, events which are known to Palestinians as the Nakba.

From 1964 onwards, the book was part of the Israeli high school curriculum. Gil Hochberg described it as the first example of the "shooting and crying" genre.

The book was also a best-seller in Israel.

The story was later made into a 1978 TV drama on Israeli Channel 1 produced by Ram Loevy, and sparked a public debate in Israel on whether it should be broadcast or not.

References

20th-century Israeli novels
1949 novels
1948 Arab–Israeli War